MYH7 is a gene encoding a myosin heavy chain beta (MHC-β) isoform (slow twitch) expressed primarily in the heart, but also in skeletal muscles (type I fibers). This isoform is distinct from the fast isoform of cardiac myosin heavy chain, MYH6, referred to as MHC-α. MHC-β is the major protein comprising the thick filament in cardiac muscle and plays a major role in cardiac muscle contraction.

Structure 

MHC-β is a 223 kDa protein composed of 1935 amino acids. MHC-β is a hexameric, asymmetric motor forming the bulk of the thick filament in cardiac muscle. MHC-β is composed of N-terminal globular heads (20 nm) that project laterally, and alpha helical tails (130 nm) that dimerize and multimerize into a coiled-coil motif to form the light meromyosin (LMM), thick filament rod. The 9 nm alpha-helical neck region of each MHC-β head non-covalently binds two light chains, essential light chain (MYL3) and regulatory light chain (MYL2).  Approximately 300 myosin molecules constitute one thick filament. There are two isoforms of cardiac MHC, α and β, which display 93% homology. MHC-α and MHC-β display significantly different enzymatic properties, with α having 150-300% the contractile velocity and 60-70% actin attachment time as that of β. MHC-β is predominately expressed in the human ventricle, while MHC-α is predominantly expressed in human atria.

Function 

It is the enzymatic activity of the ATPase in the myosin head that cyclically hydrolyzes ATP, fueling the myosin power stroke. This process converts chemical to mechanical energy, and propels shortening of the sarcomeres in order to generate intraventricular pressure and power. An accepted mechanism for this process is that ADP-bound myosin attaches to actin while thrusting tropomyosin inwards, then the S1-S2 myosin lever arm rotates ~70° about the converter domain and drives actin filaments towards the M-line.

Clinical significance 

Several mutations in MYH7 have been associated with inherited cardiomyopathies. Lowrance et al. were the first to identify the causative mutation Arg403Gln for hypertrophic cardiomyopathy (HCM) in the MYH7 gene. Studies have since identified several more MYH7 mutations, that are estimated to be causal in approximately 40% of HCM cases. This condition is an autosomal-dominant disease, in which a single copy of the variant gene causes enlargement of the left ventricle of the heart.  Disease onset usually occurs later in life, perhaps triggered by changes in thyroid hormone function and/or physical stress.

Another condition associated to mutations in this gene is paraspinal and proximal muscle atrophy.

References

Further reading

External links 
 Mass spectrometry characterization of MYH7 at COPaKB  
  GeneReviews/NIH/NCBI/UW entry on Familial Hypertrophic Cardiomyopathy Overview
  GeneReviews/NCBI/NIH/UW entry on Laing Distal Myopathy
 

Motor proteins
Articles containing video clips